Sarah Emily Davies (22 April 1830 – 13 July 1921) was an English feminist and suffragist, and a pioneering campaigner for women's rights to university access. She is remembered above all as a co-founder and an early Mistress of Girton College, Cambridge, the first university college in England to educate women.

Life
Davies was born in Carlton Crescent, Southampton, England, to an evangelical clergyman and a teacher, although she spent most of her youth in Gateshead, where her father, John D. Davies, was Rector.

Davies had been tempted to train in medicine. She wrote the article "Female Physicians" for the feminist English Woman's Journal in May 1860, and "Medicine as a Profession for Women" in 1862. Furthermore, she "greatly encouraged" her friend Elizabeth Garrett in her medical studies.

Women's rights
Davies moved, after her father's death in 1862, to London, where she edited the English Woman's Journal and became friends with such women's rights advocates as Barbara Bodichon, Elizabeth Garrett Anderson, and Millicent Fawcett. Davies became a founding member of a women's discussion group, the Kensington Society, along with Elizabeth Garrett Anderson, Barbara Bodichon, Dorothea Beale and Frances Mary Buss, who together petitioned Parliament to grant women voting rights, to no avail.

Davies began campaigning for women's rights to further education, degrees and teaching qualifications. She was active on the London School Board and in the Schools Inquiry Commission, and instrumental in obtaining the admission of girls to official secondary-school examinations. Davies went on to advocate the admission of women to the Universities of London, Oxford and Cambridge. These were exclusively male domains, like all universities at the time.

Davies became involved in the suffrage movement, which centred on a woman's right to vote. She was involved in organising for John Stuart Mill's 1866 petition to the British Parliament), which was signed by Paulina Irby, Elizabeth Garrett Anderson and 15,000 others, and the first to press for women's suffrage. That same year she wrote the book entitled The Higher Education of Women.

Girton College
In 1869, Davies led the campaign to found Britain's first women's college, with the support of Frances Buss, Dorothea Beale and Barbara Bodichon. Girton College was initially located in Hitchin, Hertfordshire, with Charlotte Manning as the first Mistress. The college then moved in 1873 to the outskirts of Cambridge.

Davies pressed for a curriculum equivalent to those offered to men of the time. The Senate rejecting her proposal to let women officially sit for the papers, but Davies continued to train students for the Cambridge Tripos exams on an unofficial basis.

Davies served as Mistress of the College in 1873–1875. In 1877, Caroline Croom Robertson joined the management as secretary to reduce the load on Davies. The College and the rest of Cambridge University only began to grant full university degrees to women in 1940.

Davies persistent fight for equal education for women was instrumental also in the founding in 1875 of Newnham College, which would be led by Anne Jemima Clough. In June 1901, Davies received an honorary Doctor of Laws (DLL) from the University of Glasgow.

Meanwhile she continued her suffrage work. In 1906, she headed a delegation to Parliament. She was known for opposing the militant and violent methods used by the Suffragette part of the women's suffrage movement, led by the Pankhursts. In 1910, Davies published Thoughts on Some Questions Relating to Women.

Emily Davies died at home in Belsize Park, Hampstead, London, on 13 July 1921 aged 91.

Quotes

Recognition
In 2016, the Council of the University of Cambridge approved the use of Davies's name to mark a physical feature within the North West Cambridge Development.

On 30 June 2019, a Blue Plaque jointly commemorating founders Emily Davies and Barbara Bodichon was unveiled at Girton College, Cambridge, by Baroness Hale, President of the Supreme Court and a graduate of Girton, as part of its 150th anniversary celebrations. The plaque is sited on the main tower at the entrance to Girton off Huntingdon Road.

See also
History of feminism

References

About.com profile of Emily Davies, Jone Johnson Lewis. Retrieved 3 February 2007
Columbia Encyclopedia entry

Further reading
Sarah Emily Davies,The Higher Education of Women [1866], Adamant Media Corporation (2006), 
Daphne Bennett, Emily Davies and the Liberation of Women (André Deutsch, 1990) 
Ann B. Murphy and Deirdre Raftery (eds), Emily Davies: Collected Letters, 1861–1875 (University of Virginia Press, 2003) 
Barbara Nightingale Stephen, Emily Davies and Girton College (Hyperion, 1976) 
Margaret Forster, Significant Sisters, Secker and Warburg, 1984 
Val Campion, Pioneering Women (Hitchin Historical Society, 2008)

External links and references

1830 births
1921 deaths
English feminists
English suffragists
Fellows of Girton College, Cambridge
Mistresses of Girton College, Cambridge
People from Southampton
Members of the London School Board
Founders of colleges of the University of Cambridge